Park Mi-ra is a female South Korean former international table tennis player.

Table tennis career
She won a bronze medal in the women's singles and a gold medal in the Corbillon Cup (women's team event) at the 1973 World Table Tennis Championships with Chung Hyun-sook, Lee Ailesa and Kim Soon-ok for South Korea.

See also
 List of table tennis players
 List of World Table Tennis Championships medalists

References

South Korean female table tennis players
World Table Tennis Championships medalists
20th-century South Korean women